The 2022–23 New Orleans Privateers men's basketball team represented the University of New Orleans during the 2022–23 NCAA Division I men's basketball season. The Privateers were led by 12th-year head coach Mark Slessinger and played their home games at Lakefront Arena as members of the Southland Conference.

Previous season
The Privateers finished the 2021–22 season 18–14, 10–4 in Southland play to finish in sixth place. In the Southland tournament, they defeated McNeese in the second round, before falling to Southeastern in the semifinals.  The Privateers were invited to the 2022 The Basketball Classic.  Their season ended with a loss to Portland.

Preseason polls

Southland Conference Poll
The Southland Conference released its preseason poll on October 25, 2022. Receiving 2 first place votes and 129 votes overall, the Privateers were picked to finish third in the conference.

Preseason All Conference
Tyson Jackson and Simeon Kirkland were selected as a second team members.

Roster

Schedule and results

|-
!colspan=9 style=|Non-conference regular season

|-
!colspan=9 style=|Southland Conference regular season

|-
!colspan=12 style=| Southland Tournament

Source:

See also
2022–23 New Orleans Privateers women's basketball team

References

New Orleans Privateers men's basketball seasons
New Orleans
New Orleans Privateers men's basketball
New Orleans Privateers men's basketball